is a Japanese multimedia project created by Hajime Yatate and Sakurako Kimino and co-produced by Kadokawa through ASCII Media Works; Bandai Namco Music Live through music label Lantis; and animation studio Bandai Namco Filmworks (formerly known as Sunrise). Each of the individual titles within the franchise revolve around teenage girls who become "school idols". Starting in June 2010 with Love Live! School Idol Project, the franchise has seen multiple anime television series, two anime films, light novels, manga, and video games. The rhythm game series Love Live! School Idol Festival features characters across multiple Love Live! titles.

Overview
Each title in the Love Live! franchise focuses on groups of teenage schoolgirls who become "school idols" as an extracurricular activity, and their main activities involve singing and choreographed dancing to self-written songs they perform at concerts or other music events. Other activities include designing their own costumes, as well as filming promotional videos and music videos. Top-class groups are very popular among fans of school idols, aided in part by exposure in magazines and other media, in addition to merchandise of school idols sold in shops catering to otaku-related items.

The ultimate school idol competition featuring the best groups in Japan is called Love Live, and entry into the competition is determined by the popularity of each group. The size of these groups can range anywhere from solo idols to groups with nine or more members. Due to the highly competitive nature of the Love Live competition, some school idols opt not to attempt entry and simply take part in performing at other events. However, participation in the event is very prestigious, and any group that wins the competition is afforded legendary status.

Franchise history

Love Live! School Idol Project was first announced in the July 2010 issue of ASCII Media Works' Dengeki G's Magazine, which revealed that the magazine would be collaborating with the anime studio Sunrise and the music label Lantis to co-produce the project. The project officially began with the August 2010 issue of Dengeki G's Magazine, which introduced the story, characters, and a more detailed explanation of the project. The original plan for the story was written by Sakurako Kimino, who also writes short stories and light novels for Love Live!. Yūhei Murota created the original character designs.

Starting in August 2010, online mobile phone popularity contests were periodically held to rank the characters, which influenced the positions of the idols in the anime music videos produced by Sunrise. For example, the idol who ranked first in a given contest would be in the center position in the front row in the music video that followed. Other polls were used to determine different aspects of the idols, such as hairstyles and costumes. Fans also determined the name of the initial school idol group, ultimately choosing the name μ's (muse). Lantis released the group's first single in August 2010, and they continued to release several more singles and albums over the course of the next two years, including performing their first concert in 2012 at Yokohama Blitz in Yokohama, Japan. This was soon followed by an anime television series that aired from 2013 to 2014, and an anime film in 2015.

The rhythm game series Love Live! School Idol Festival developed by KLab and published by Bushiroad's Bushimo for Android and iOS platforms launched in 2013. The initial game is free-to-play with an in-app purchase system. It features songs and characters across multiple Love Live! titles, along with newly introduced girls, and stories that are not included in other media. The English localization was released worldwide in 2014, and it also was localized in China, Hong Kong, Macau, Taiwan, and South Korea. An arcade version of the game developed and published by Square Enix titled Love Live! School Idol Festival: After School Activity was released in Japan in 2016, and a PlayStation 4 port was released in North America, Japan, and Southeast Asia in 2021. Another spin-off game titled Love Live! School Idol Festival All Stars was released in 2019 in Japan and 2020 worldwide.

The next major installment in the franchise was the spin-off Love Live! Sunshine!! announced in 2015. Fans also chose the name of the idol group for Sunshine, deciding on the name Aqours (aqua). Similarly to Love Live! School Idol Project, Lantis released the group's first single in October 2015, releasing several more singles into the following year. This was followed by an anime television series that aired from 2016 to 2017, and an anime film in 2019.

In March 2017, the official website of Love Live School Idol Festival launched the "Perfect Dream Project", which featured nine new girls that would be incorporated into Love Live! Nijigasaki High School Idol Club; a tenth member was added in 2020. Unlike μ's and Aqours, they are not a traditional group, but rather individual school idols who compete with each other are referred to collectively as the Nijigasaki High School Idol Club. The idols are featured in Love Live! School Idol Festival All Stars alongside μ's and Aqours, and also appear in the main Love Live! School Idol Festival game. Lantis released the debut album for Nijigasaki High School Idol Club in 2018, and this was followed by two more albums and several singles over the course of the next two years, including performing their first concert in 2018 at DiverCity Tokyo Plaza Festival Square. An anime television series premiered in 2020, with a second season which premiered in 2022.

In January 2020, a franchise-wide concert, titled Love Live! Fest, were held at Saitama Super Arena, in commemoration for the franchise's ninth anniversary. All three groups at the time performed at this concert, including μ's, which was their first performance after a three-year hiatus since their "final" concert in April 2016.

Another spin-off titled Love Live! Superstar!! was announced in 2020 as an anime television series. Fans also chose the name of the idol group for Superstar, deciding on Liella!. The anime series premiered in 2021; a second season aired in 2022. A third season was announced following the conclusion of the second season.

Another spin-off, focusing on "virtual school idols" was announced in February 2022. They began their activities in late 2022, with the six new girls referred to as the Hasunosora Girls' High School Idol Club. A teaser video released in October 2022 announced that the launch of a smartphone app, titled Link! Like! Love Live!, in April 2023.

A new project that focuses on musical theater performances titled School Idol Musical was announced on September 26, 2022. It features 10 girls, five of each who are students of two "legendary schools" located in Osaka and Hyogo.

School idol groups

Media

Anime series

A 13-episode anime television series of Love Live! School Idol Project produced by Sunrise, directed by Takahiko Kyōgoku, and written by Jukki Hanada aired in Japan on Tokyo MX from January 6 to March 31, 2013 and was simulcast by Crunchyroll. An original video animation episode was released on November 27, 2013. A second season aired on Tokyo MX from April 6 to June 29, 2014, also airing on TV Aichi, Yomiuri TV, and BS11, and was simulcast by Crunchyroll. Both seasons are licensed in North America by NIS America, who released the premium edition of the first season on Blu-ray on September 2, 2014 and an English dubbed version was released with the standard edition of the first season, along with the premium edition of the second season, on February 14, 2016, as well as the standard edition of the second season on April 12, 2016. The Blu-ray set for season one has since gone out of print and season one was removed from Crunchyroll. MVM Entertainment released the first season in the United Kingdom on July 27, 2015 on DVD, with plans to release it on Blu-ray Disc in 2016 with an English dub. MVM Entertainment also released the second season in 2016. Madman Entertainment released the first season in Australia and New Zealand on June 10, 2015 on DVD.

A 13-episode anime television series of Love Live! Sunshine!! produced by Sunrise, directed by Kazuo Sakai, and written by Jukki Hanada aired between July 2 and September 24, 2016 and was simulcast by Crunchyroll. A 13-episode second season aired between October 7 and December 30, 2017. The series is licensed in North America by Funimation, in the United Kingdom by Anime Limited, and in Australia by Madman Entertainment. An English dub by Funimation began streaming from July 30, 2016.

A 13-episode anime television series of Love Live! Nijigasaki High School Idol Club produced by Bandai Namco Filmworks, directed by Tomoyuki Kawamura, and written by Jin Tanaka, aired between October 3 and December 26, 2020. It was also streamed live through the Bandai Channel, Line Live, and YouTube Live. A second season aired between April 2 and June 25, 2022. Nijiyon Animation, an adaptation of the spin-off four-panel manga Nijiyon: Love Live! Nijigasaki Gakuen School Idol Dōkōkai Yon-Koma, was announced on September 18, 2022. It premiered on January 6, 2023.

Love Live! Superstar!! was announced in 2020 as an anime television series, and aired for 12 episodes between July 11 and October 17, 2021 on NHK Educational TV. A second season aired between July 17 and October 9, 2022. A third season has been announced.

Genjitsu no Yohane: Sunshine in the Mirror, a fantasy spinoff featuring the cast of Love Live! Sunshine!!, was announced on June 26, 2022. It is set to premiere in July 2023.

Films
An animated film titled Love Live! The School Idol Movie was released in theaters on June 13, 2015. The film was released theatrically in South Korea on September 3, 2015, in the United States on September 11, 2015 and in Indonesia on October 21. As of December 2015, the film had been shown in several other countries, including Australia, Brunei, Hong Kong,  Malaysia, New Zealand, the Philippines, Singapore, Taiwan, Thailand and Vietnam, and was also scheduled to be released in Canada at the start of 2016. It was released on Blu-ray in Japan on December 15, 2015. The film was released in North America by NIS America on June 28, 2016 in a premium edition, and July 26, 2016 in a standard edition, both with an English dub.

An anime film titled Love Live! Sunshine!! The School Idol Movie: Over the Rainbow was released on January 4, 2019 in Japan. An English dub of the film was released on February 25, 2020. The main staff and cast return to reprise their roles for the film.

Magazine

A dedicated Love Live! magazine launched on July 1, 2019 as a spin-off of Dengeki G's Magazine published by ASCII Media Works. Initially untitled, the magazine offered readers the chance to suggest names for the magazine and vote on them, leading to the magazine's title of LoveLive! Days starting with volume 3. The magazine offers information on the entire Love Live! franchise including the latest information on school idol groups, media adaptations, and also includes serialized Love Live! manga. The magazine also gives fans the ability to influence the franchise by voting on ideas for songs and costumes.

Sales
Love Live! was ranked No. 1 in top-selling physical media franchises in Japan for 2016 and ranked No. 4 in 2015. The franchise's physical media earned over ¥8 billion in 2016 and over ¥5 billion in 2015. This includes the raw yen totals of Blu-ray Discs, DVDs, music CDs, novels, and manga, but not video games, film tickets, digital downloads, and other forms of media sales. In 2013, physical media sales generated  in Japan. DVD and Blu-ray sales of the anime's second season in 2014 sold  in Japan. The franchise's physical media sales generated  in Japan between 2015 and 2018.

The following table lists the annual content revenue from Love Live media in Japan, as reported by market research firm Hakuhodo.

Notes

References

External links

 
Official worldwide website

 
ASCII Media Works
Bandai Namco franchises
Bushiroad
Kadokawa Dwango franchises
Lantis (company)
Mass media franchises introduced in 2010
Sunrise (company)